Ahmed Akhchichine ( – born 26 March 1954 in Marrakech) is a Moroccan politician of the Authenticity and Modernity Party. Between 2007 and 2012, he held the position of Minister of Education in the cabinet of Abbas El Fassi. In 2015 he was elected president of the Marrakech-Safi region.

Between 2003 and 2012, he was the president of the "HACA" (Haute Autorité de la Communication Audiovisuelle) Morocco's radio and television highest regulating authority.
 
Although he belongs to the Authenticity and Modernity Party, he participated in the cabinet as an independent since his party, which formed in 2008, positioned itself in the opposition.

See also
Cabinet of Morocco

References

Living people
Education Ministers of Morocco
Government ministers of Morocco
1952 births
People from Marrakesh
Moroccan male journalists
Authenticity and Modernity Party politicians